This is a list of past and present programs broadcast by the Canadian television channel OLN and in its former incarnations Outdoor Life Network and Outdoor Life.

Present

#

A-E
Dirt Trax Television

F-J
Fail Army
Fish TV
Impractical Jokers

K-O

P-T
Storage Wars
Storage Wars Canada

U-Z

Past

#
2000 European Football Championships
2010 Winter Olympics

A-E
Angry Planet
Angler and Hunter Television
The Beat
The Best and Worst of Tred Barta
Beyond Borders
Beyond Survival
Buck Commander
Campus PD
Canada in the Rough
The Canadian Tradition
Close Up Kings
Conspiracy Theory with Jesse Ventura
Courage in Red
Crash Addicts
Creepy Canada
Dangerous Game
Deals from the Darkside
Descending
Departures
Destination Truth
Dog The Bounty Hunter
Duck Commander
Duck Dynasty
Dudesons
Dussault Inc.
Dynamo: Magician Impossible
Ed's Up

F-J
Forbidden
Get Stuffed
Ghost Hunters
The Happenings
Haunted Collector
Half Mile Of Hell
Hillbilly Preppers: Atlanta
I Shouldn't Be Alive
Illusions of Grandeur

K-O
Kentucky Bidders
Killing Bigfoot
The Liquidator
The Liquidator: On the Go
Man v. Food
Mantracker
Meat Eater
Minute to Win It
Monsterquest
NASCAR Outdoors
ODYSSEY: Driving Around the World
Operation Repo
The Outhouse

P-T
Pilot Guides
Polar Bear Town
The Project - Guatemala
Python Hunters
RCTV
Red Bull: Air Race
Red Bull: Cliff Diving
Red Bull: Crashed Ice
Red Bull: Signature Series
Red Bull: X-Fighters
The Rig
Saw Dogs
Snowmobiler TV
SnowTrax Television
Road Hockey Rumble
Spruce Meadows
Storage Hunters
Storage Wars: New York
Storage Wars: Texas
Survivorman
Tour de France
Tow Biz
Treks in a Wild World

U-Z
UFO Hunters
Which Way To...
Wild Things with Dominic Monaghan
Word Travels
You Can't Lick Your Elbow

See also
OLN
NBC Sports Network

External links
 OLN website

Lists of television series by network